Vision, Visions, or The Vision may refer to:

Perception

Optical perception
 Visual perception, the sense of sight
 Visual system, the physical mechanism of eyesight
 Computer vision, a field dealing with how computers can be made to gain understanding from digital images or videos
 Machine vision, technology for imaging-based automatic inspection

Perception of the future
 Foresight (psychology), in business, the ability to envisage future market trends and plan accordingly
 Goal, a desired result
 Vision statement, a declaration of objectives to guide decision-making

Other perceptions
 Vision (spirituality), a supernatural experience that conveys a revelation
 Hallucination, a perception of something that does not exist

Arts and media

Events
 Visions (convention), a science fiction event
 Vision Festival, a New York City art festival

Film and television
 "The Vision", episode of Alcoa Presents: One Step Beyond
 The Vision (film), 1998 British television movie 
 Vision (2009 film), German film
 Vision (2018 film), Japanese-French film
 Visions (film), 2016 American thriller film
 Visions (1976 TV series), a 1976-80 anthology series on PBS
 Visions (2022 TV series), a 2022-present anthology series on Disney+
 VisionTV, Canadian TV channel
 BT Vision, British digital TV service
 Vision (Marvel Cinematic Universe), film character that debuted in 2015, based on the original Marvel Comics character

Literature

Comics
 Vision (Marvel Comics), a Marvel Comics superhero character that debuted in 1968
 Vision (Jonas), a Marvel Comics character that first appeared in Young Avengers in 2005 
 Vision (Timely Comics), a Timely Comics character that debuted in 1940

Other literature
 Vision (magazine), an Emirati magazine
 The Vision (magazine), an Indian spiritual magazine
 A Vision, a 1925 nonfiction book by W. B. Yeats
 The Vision (novel), a 1977 novel by Dean Koontz
 York Vision, a student newspaper
 Visions (book), a 1997 science book by Michio Kaku

Music

Albums
 Vision (Alpha Blondy album)
 Vision (Frank Duval album)

 Vision (No Fun at All EP), by No Fun at All
 The Vision (WayV EP), 2019
 Visions (Atreyu album)
 Visions (Dennis Brown album)
 Visions (Clearlight album), 1978
 Visions (Paul Field album)
 Visions (Gladys Knight & the Pips album), 1983
 Visions (Bunky Green album), 1978
 Visions (Grant Green album), 1971
 Visions (Grimes album), 2012
 Visions (Haken album), 2011
 Visions (Jakatta album)
 Visions (Libera album), 2005
 Vision (Shankar album), 1983
 Visions (Stratovarius album), 1997
 Visions (Sun Ra album), 1978
 Vision, an album by Luminous
 Visions, an album by Disasteradio

Songs
 "The Vision", an 1877 composition by Modest Mussorgsky
 "Visions" (Cliff Richard song), 1966
 "Vision" (McCoy Tyner song), a 1969 jazz instrumental
 "The Vision", a song by Exuma from his 1970 album Exuma
 "Vision", a song by Peter Hammill from his 1971 album Fool's Mate
 "Visions", a song by Stevie Wonder from his 1973 album Innervisions
 "Visions", a song by the Eagles from their 1975 album One of These Nights
 "Vision", a song by Gotthard from their 1998 album Open
 "Visions", a song by Cut Copy from their 2008 album In Ghost Colours
 "Visions", a song by Bring Me the Horizon from their 2010 album There Is a Hell Believe Me I've Seen It. There Is a Heaven Let's Keep It a Secret.
 "Visions", a song by Maroon 5 from their 2017 album Red Pill Blues
 "Vision", a song by Dreamcatcher from their 2022 EP Apocalypse: Follow Us

Buildings
 Vision Brisbane, a planned skyscraper in Australia
 Vision Tower, a tower in Dubai

Businesses and organisations

Businesses
 Vision (nightclub), in Chicago, Illinois, US
 Vision Airlines, based in North Las Vegas, Nevada, US
 Vision Fitness, a fitness equipment subsidiary of Johnson Health Tech
 Vision Group, a Ugandan media company (print, television and radio)
 Vision Street Wear, a footwear company

Other organizations
 Vision (trade union), a Swedish white-collar union
 Vision Australia, a blindness organisation
 Vision Montreal, a political party
 Vision Racing, an auto racing team
 Vision Vancouver, a political party
 Vision Zero, a road traffic safety project begun in Sweden

Religion
"The Vision", an 1832 revelation to Joseph Smith and Sidney Rigdon which established a degree of Universalist belief in the Latter Day Saint movement

Science and technology

 Computer vision, a field dealing with how computers can be made to gain understanding from digital images or videos
 Machine vision, technology for imaging-based automatic inspection
 Visions (cookware), a brand of transparent stove top cookware
 Vision (game engine)
 Vision (IRC), an IRC client for BeOS
 Vision Mobile Browser
 Vision for Space Exploration, a U.S. government plan
 Sega Vision, a portable media player
 Visi On, an IBM operating environment

Vehicles

Aircraft
 Pro-Composites Vision, an amateur-built aircraft
 Cirrus Vision SF50, a single-engine very light jet aircraft

Automotive
 Blue Bird Vision, a school bus
 Eagle Vision, a car

Ships
 , any of several U.S. Navy ships
 Vision, a ship used by botanist Frederick Strange during the early days of Australian colonisation
 Vision-class cruise ship, six ships built by Royal Caribbean International
 Vision of the Seas, a cruise ship
 MV Atlantic Vision, a ferry used in Canada

See also
 Visionary